Maga Mommaga is a 1974 Indian Kannada-language film, directed by Y. R. Swamy and produced by R. Panduranga Naidu and D. R. Raghavendra Naidu. The film stars Dwarakish, K. S. Ashwath, Vajramuni and Balakrishna in the lead roles. The film has musical score by M. Ranga Rao. The film was a remake of the Telugu film Tata Manavadu.

Cast

Dwarakish
K. S. Ashwath
Vajramuni
Balakrishna
M. S. Sathya
Hanumanthachar
Master Arun
Chandrakala
Leelavathi
Shailashree
M. N. Lakshmidevi
Vijayakala
Baby Shyam
Chethan
Ashwath Narayan
T. Thimmayya
Sriram
Bheema Rao
Thyagaraj Urs
Ramanna
Mohan
Manohar
T. Raju
Padmanabha Rao
Honnappa
Kannada Raju

Soundtrack
The music was composed by M. Ranga Rao.

References

External links
 

1974 films
1970s Kannada-language films
Films scored by M. Ranga Rao
Kannada remakes of Telugu films
Films directed by Y. R. Swamy